Valery Oisteanu (born September 3, 1943) is a Soviet-born Romanian and American poet, art critic, essayist, photographer and performance artist, whose style reflects the influence of Dada and Surrealism. Oisteanu is the author of more than a dozen books of poetry, a book of short fiction, and a book of essays. More about his creativity & writing at his website:https://www.zen-dada.com He is the brother of Romanian historian of religion, cultural anthropologist and writer Andrei Oișteanu.

Biography
Oisteanu was born in Karaganda, Kazakhstan, raised and educated in Romania, where he was known as Valeriu Oișteanu. He graduated from the Department of Chemical Industry of the Politechnical Institute in Bucharest.

In 1970, Oisteanu made his literary debut in Romania with a collection of poems called Proteze. Due to his Jewish ancestry, the Communist regime allowed him to emigrate to New York City in 1972 or 1973, and he has been writing in  English ever since.

Oisteanu adopted Dada and Surrealism as a philosophy of art and life. He appears regularly at poetry readings in various New York venues, where he presents original performances of Zen and Dada-inspired "jazzoetry". He is a freelance art critic and on the permanent staff of several arts magazines, including The Brooklyn Rail, NYArts, Rain Taxi, the Spanish publication art.es, and the Canadian magazine D'Art International. Oișteanu is a member of Poets and Writers Inc. in New York and the founder and president of PASS: Poets and Artists Surrealist Society.

Poetry written in English
Underground Shadows (Pass Press, New York, 1977)
Underwater Temples (Pass Press, New York, 1979)
Do Not Defuse (Pass Press, New York, 1980)
Vis-a-vis Bali (poems and photographic collage; New Observation Press, New York, 1985)
Passport to Eternal Life (Pass Press, New York, 1990)
Moons of Venus (Pass Press, New York, 1992)
Temporary Immortality (Pass Press, New York, 1995)
ZEN DADA (Linear Art Press, New York, 1999)
Perks in Purgatory (Fly by Night Press,New York, 2009)
Anarchy for a Rainy Day (Spuyten Duyvil, New York, 2015)
Lighter Than Air (Spuyten Duyvil, New York, 2017)
In the Blink of a Third Eye(Spuyten Duyvil, New York, 2020)

Poetry written or translated to Romanian:
Proteze ("Prosthesis"), Editura Litera, Bucharest, 1970
Poeme din Exil ("Poems from Exile"), Editura Paralela 45, Pitești, 2000
 "Anarhie pentru Zile Negre"(Anarchy for a Rainy Day) CDPL,Bucharest,2019
  Privileges in Purgatory (Translated to Romanian) Itaca,Dublin,2020

Prose written in English
The King of Penguins (Linear Arts Books, New York, 2000)

References

External links
"The Drum Circle for Janine Pommy Vega" – this tribute to Janine Pommy Vega (1942–2010) on Pierre Joris's blog includes this homage-poem written by Oişteanu in honor of Pommy-Vega
"The Life and Death of John Badum" & "Lorenzo Perrone — The Righteous Gentile" – these 2 "stories" by Oisteanu are about two true life figures: fashion designer John Badum, who was murdered in May 1999; and Lorenzo Perrone, friend and "guardian angel" to the world famous writer and Holocaust survivor Primo Levi
, Meditation/Mediation is described as "an ongoing project conceived by Daniel Rothbart in collaboration with Valery Oisteanu. Curated by Lisa Paul Streitfeld, The Lab Gallery, New York, NY, April 24, 2005"
At The Caves of the Wind: Cretan Meditations – an "essay-meditation" about Crete which Oisteanu first visited in July, 1977
Vispo Collage from Valery Oişteanu – some poetry-collages (or visual poetry) by Oisteanu
MARCEL BROODTHAERS, The Living Mirror – Oisteanu writes about Marcel Broodthaers for The Brooklyn Rail, published in October 2010
Where have the Real Famous gone? to Andy Warhol – a poem by Oisteanu

1943 births
20th-century Romanian photographers
American art critics
American essayists
American male essayists
American male poets
American people of Romanian-Jewish descent
American performance artists
American photographers
American spoken word poets
Jewish American writers
Jewish Romanian writers
Living people
Neo-Dada
People from Karaganda
Politehnica University of Bucharest alumni
Romanian art critics
Romanian collage artists
Romanian emigrants to the United States
Romanian essayists
Romanian male writers
Romanian performance artists
Romanian poets
Romanian photographers
Romanian surrealist writers
Soviet emigrants to Romania
Soviet Jews
21st-century American Jews